Events in the year 1901 in India.

Incumbents
 Empress of India – Queen Victoria until 22 January
 Emperor of India – Edward VII from 22 January
 Viceroy of India – George Curzon, 1st Marquess Curzon of Kedleston

Events
 National income - 7,666 million
 The first reliable census in India is taken.

Law
Indian Tolls (Army & Air Force) Act

Births
2 July – Kalindi Charan Panigrahi, poet, novelist, story writer, dramatist and essayist (died 1991).

Deaths
16 January – Mahadev Govind Ranade, judge, author and reformer (born 1842).
16 June – Sultan Shah Jahan, Begum of Bhopal (born 1838)

References

 
India
Years of the 20th century in India